Edwin Burnhope Cunningham (20 September 1919 – April 1993) was an English professional footballer who played as an outside forward in the Football League for Bristol City.

References 

English footballers
English Football League players
Brentford F.C. wartime guest players
1919 births
1993 deaths
Association football outside forwards
Sportspeople from Jarrow
Footballers from Tyne and Wear
Bristol City F.C. players